Shinya Chiba (born 12 December 1961) is a Japanese former alpine skier who competed in the 1984 Winter Olympics and 1988 Winter Olympics.

External links
 sports-reference.com

1961 births
Living people
Japanese male alpine skiers
Olympic alpine skiers of Japan
Alpine skiers at the 1984 Winter Olympics
Alpine skiers at the 1988 Winter Olympics
Place of birth missing (living people)
20th-century Japanese people